Shir Tappeh (also Romanized as Shīr Tappeh and Shīr Tepe) is a village in Tajan Rural District, in the Central District of Sarakhs County, Razavi Khorasan Province, Iran. At the 2006 census, its population was 2,805, in 624 families.

References 

Populated places in Sarakhs County